Patrick Joseph Morley (1 March 1931 – 30 September 2012) was an Irish Fianna Fáil politician.

Morley was from Claremorris, County Mayo. He qualified as a primary school teacher. He was first elected to Dáil Éireann as a Fianna Fáil Teachta Dála (TD) for the Mayo East constituency on his second attempt at the 1977 general election and was re-elected until losing his seat at the 1997 general election. At the 1997 general election the Mayo East constituency was combined with Mayo West and the combined Mayo constituency was reduced to 5 seats. He was the Chairperson of Mayo County Council from 1989 to 1991. He died in September 2012.

References

1931 births
2012 deaths
Fianna Fáil TDs
Politicians from County Mayo
Local councillors in County Mayo
Members of the 21st Dáil
Members of the 22nd Dáil
Members of the 23rd Dáil
Members of the 24th Dáil
Members of the 25th Dáil
Members of the 26th Dáil
Members of the 27th Dáil
Irish schoolteachers